Harryette Mullen (born July 1, 1953), Professor of English at University of California, Los Angeles, is an American poet, short story writer, and literary scholar.

Life
Mullen was born in Florence, Alabama, grew up in Fort Worth, Texas, graduated from the University of Texas at Austin, and attended graduate school at the University of California, Santa Cruz. As of 2008, she lives in Los Angeles, California.  Mullen's most recent work is Urban Tumbleweed: Notes from a Tanka Diary.

Mullen began to write poetry as a college student in a multicultural community of writers, artists, musicians, and dancers in Austin, Texas. As an emerging poet, Mullen received a literature award from the Black Arts Academy, a Dobie-Paisano writer’s fellowship from the Texas Institute of Letters and University of Texas, and an artist residency from the Helene Wurlitzer Foundation of New Mexico. In Texas, she worked in the Artists in Schools program before enrolling in graduate school in California where she continued her study of American literature and encountered even more diverse communities of writers and artists.

Mullen was influenced by the social, political, and cultural movements of African Americans, Mexican Americans, and women in the 1960s-70s, including the Civil Rights Movement, Black Power movement, the Black Arts Movement, Chicano Movement, and feminism. Her first book, Tree Tall Woman, which showed traces of all of these influences, was published in 1981.

Especially in her later books, Trimmings, S*PeRM**K*T, Muse & Drudge, and Sleeping with the Dictionary, Mullen frequently combines cultural critique with humor and wordplay as her poetry grapples with topics such as globalization, mass culture, consumerism, and the politics of identity. Critics, including Elisabeth Frost and Juliana Spahr, have suggested that Mullen’s poetry audience is an eclectic community of collaborative readers who share individual and collective interpretations of poems that may provoke multiple, divergent, or contradictory meanings, according to each reader’s cultural background.

Mullen has taught at Cornell University and currently teaches courses in American poetry, African-American literature, and creative writing at the University of California, Los Angeles. While living in Ithaca and Rochester, New York, she was a faculty fellow of the Cornell University Society for the Humanities and a Rockefeller fellow at the Susan B. Anthony Institute at University of Rochester. She has received a Gertrude Stein Award for innovative poetry, a Katherine Newman Award for best essay on U.S. ethnic literature, a Foundation for Contemporary Arts Grants to Artists award (2004), and a fellowship from the John Simon Guggenheim Memorial Foundation. Her poetry collection, Sleeping with the Dictionary (2002), was a finalist for a National Book Award, National Book Critics Circle Award, and Los Angeles Times Book Prize. She received a PEN/Beyond Margins Award for her Recyclopedia (2006). She is also credited for rediscovering the novel Oreo, published in 1974 by Fran Ross. Mullen won the fourth annual Jackson Poetry Prize from Poets & Writers in 2010.

She appears in the documentary film The Black Candle, directed by M. K. Asante, Jr. and narrated by Maya Angelou.

Background 
Mullen has stated that she was brought up in Fort Worth, Texas, but that her family is originally from Pennsylvania. Growing up in such a small black community was hard especially because, as Mullen has said in interviews, "a black Southern vernacular was spoken, which my family didn't speak." This created a division between Mullen and her peers who considered her an outsider for speaking "white."

Language 
Mullen recalls on the different languages that she learned as a child as opposed to those around her. When one hears the term different languages one thinks of languages that are spoken in other far away foreign places, yet Mullen is discussing the different types of English that are spoken in her community. The English she grew up learning was considered to be the “Standard English,” which is summed up as the proper way of speaking English, the one that will make black people more approachable in a nice part of town, the English that will make a person of color employable. The black vernacular is considered to be incorrect, and if people only spoke this vernacular they would be considered uneducated. This did not sit well with Mullen because she wanted black children to understand that being black and educated were not mutually exclusive terms. Mullen says that she does not believe that certain vernaculars are particularly educated or uneducated; society has however decided for them that there is a right way of speaking and a wrong way.

Influences 
Language is the bridge that can connect two different cultures, and Mullen experienced the opposite of that when she was growing up at first. The "Standard English" she spoke created a barrier for her she could not anticipate. As it does for many other black children that speak "proper" and are considered different for it. This contributes to black children equating their blackness to their language making some feel inadequate because they don’t sound "black enough."

As Mullen comes to understand in college there is more than one way of being black, and this came as a shock to her because she was learning about all these other black cultures from a white man. Mullen thought it strange that she could obviously see the blackness of different cultures and yet hold no true meaningful relation to it. There was not type of familiarity between her and all these other black cultures.

Even in the black community where she should feel "safe" in or "belong," Mullen felt alienated. Code switching is in many ways the key to survival in these instances. For black children all over they know how to speak when they are hanging out with friends versus how they should speak to a cop if they are pulled over.

Work

Poetry collections
Tree Tall Woman, 1981
Trimmings, 1991
S*PeRM**K*T, 1992
Muse & Drudge, 1995
Sleeping with the Dictionary, 2002
Blues Baby, 2002,
Recyclopedia: Trimmings, S*PeRM**K*T, Muse and Drudge, 2006
Urban Tumbleweed: Notes from a Tanka Diary, 2013

Critical essays and books
"Runaway Tongue: Resistant Orality in Uncle Tom’s Cabin, Incidents in the Life of a Slave Girl, Our Nig, and Beloved", The Culture of Sentiment, 1992
"Optic White: Blackness and the Production of Whiteness", Diacritics, 1994; reprinted in Cultural and Literary Critiques of the Concept of 'Race''', 1997
"'A Silence Between Us Like a Language': The Untranslatability of Experience in Sandra Cisneros' Woman Hollering Creek", MELUS Journal, 1996
"Incessant Elusives: the Oppositional Poetics of Erica Hunt and Will Alexander," "Holding their Own: Perspectives on the Multi-Ethnic Literatures of the United States", 2000. 
"African Signs and Spirit Writing", Callaloo, 1996; reprinted in African American Literary Theory: A Reader, 2000, and The Black Studies Reader, 2004
"'Apple Pie with Oreo Crust': Fran Ross’s Recipe for an Idiosyncratic American Novel", MELUS Journal, 2002
"'Artistic Expression was Flowing Everywhere': Alison Mills and Ntozake Shange, Black Bohemian Feminists in the 1970s", Meridians, 2004The Cracks Between What We Are and What We Are Supposed To Be: Essays and Interviews (University of Alabama Press), 2012

Collaboration
In 2011, Barbara Henning published a collection of postcard interviews with the author, titled: Looking Up Harryette Mullen'' (Belladonna). In it, Mullen writes, "Poetry, in general, is a rule-breaking activity."

References

External links
 UCTV: 1/2 Video of Harryette Reading her Poetry
 "Add-Verse" a poetry-photo-video project Mullen participated in

1953 births
People from Florence, Alabama
American feminists
University of California, Los Angeles faculty
Language poets
Living people
Modernist women writers
Poets from Texas
American women poets
Modernist writers
21st-century American women